Aston Flamville is a village and civil parish in the Blaby district in Leicestershire, England.  It is situated near Hinckley, but on the other (eastern) side of the M69.  It has a population of 150 and consequently has a parish meeting rather than a parish council. The population at the 2011 census had increased to 311.

History

Toponymy
The village's name means 'east farm/settlement'. In 1247 the village was held by Robert de Flamvile.

Turville family

Dame Mary Roskell wrote of the Turville family as follows:
"The noble and ancient family of Turville, 
formerly de Tourville, was planted in this 
country by one of the companions of William 
the Norman, and for some generations flourished 
at Normanton Turville in Leicestershire, when, 
having married the heiress of the Flamvilles of 
Aston Flamville (who from their arms the 
maunch would appear to have been a branch 
of the family of Hastings, the pristine lords of 
Aston Flamville), they settled at that place and 
resided there, until the marriage of the representative of the family with the heiress of the Fortescues of Bosworth Hall, county Leicester, 
and Idbury, county Oxford, etc., brought those 
estates into the family. If we respect a family, 
as we ought to do, for preserving an ancient 
patrimony and position by piety, prudence and 
self-denial, still more must we venerate such a 
family as this, which not only exhibits the above 
virtues but possesses the far higher one of having 
preserved inviolate the ancient faith through 
centuries of persecution and injustice, and thus 
stands as a living witness against modern 
assumptions".

Civil War
The records of the Warwickshire county committee reveal that Aston Flamville was occasionally visited by troops from the parliamentary garrisons in north Warwickshire. Among a list of claims for losses and "free quarter" submitted to the county committee in June, 1646 George Turville, of Aston Flamville, described as a gentleman, claimed for twelve strikes of oats and three strikes of peas worth 16s 6d taken by Coventry forces. William Turville, another gentleman, claimed that troops under Colonel Barker from the Coventry garrison took two horses with bridles and saddles worth £13.  Mr Hill claimed on another occasion that troops from the Astley, Warwickshire garrison took a horse and "divers other things" worth £12.

References

External links

An interactive map showing pictures including Aston Flamville

Villages in Leicestershire
Civil parishes in Leicestershire
Blaby